The Hotel Fredeirica is a historic commercial building at 625 West Capitol Avenue in Little Rock, Arkansas.  The five-story building was built in 1914 and enlarged in 1941.  The original building was designed by Theodore M. Sanders, and the addition by Edward Durell Stone, both prominent Arkansas architects.  Both sections of the building are excellent representatives of their architectural styles: the older in a typical early 20th-century commercial style, and the addition in the International style.

Originally built by Arkansas Gazette newspaperman Fred W. Allsopp, the hotel was sold to Sam Peck in 1935.

The building was listed on the National Register of Historic Places in 2003.

See also
National Register of Historic Places listings in Little Rock, Arkansas

References

External links
Legacy Hotel web site

Hotel buildings on the National Register of Historic Places in Arkansas
International style architecture in Arkansas
Hotel buildings completed in 1914
Buildings and structures in Little Rock, Arkansas
National Register of Historic Places in Little Rock, Arkansas
Hotels in Arkansas
1914 establishments in Arkansas